The 1961 William & Mary Indians football team was an American football team that represented the College of William & Mary as a member of the Southern Conference (SoCon) during the 1961 NCAA University Division football season. In their fifth season under head coach Milt Drewer, William & Mary compiled a 1–9 record, with a mark of 1–6 in conference play, placing ninth in the SoCon.

Schedule

References

William and Mary
William & Mary Tribe football seasons
William